The Big Comfy Couch (Le Monde de Loonette [English: The World of Loonette or Loonette's World] when broadcast in Quebec, France and Belgium and El sofa da la imaginación [English: The Couch of Imagination] when broadcast in Latin America and Spain) is a Canadian children's television series, which is about a clown named Loonette and her doll Molly who solve everyday problems on their eponymous couch. It aired from March 2, 1992, until December 29, 2006. It was produced by Cheryl Wagner and Robert Mills, directed by Wayne Moss, Robert Mills and Steve Wright. It premiered on March 2, 1992, in Canada and on January 9, 1995, in the United States on PBS stations across the country. The program was also broadcast on Treehouse TV from 1997 to 2011.

Synopsis
Each episode contains numerous standard elements that take place throughout the episode. In each show, Loonette performs an exercise routine she calls the Clock Rug Stretch. Other oft-repeated elements include reading a story to Molly, who sometimes either chooses a story to hear, gives Loonette a book and oversized glasses, or turning on the lights for Loonette; encounters with the dust bunnies who live under the couch; visits to different places in Clowntown, songs that emphasize the episode's lessons or themes, and a trip to Granny Garbanzo's garden. Here she encounters Snicklefritz, Granny's cat; Major Bedhead, the local mail-delivery clown, who travels on a unicycle; and Granny herself. The conversation with Granny is often used as the episode's teachable moment, where Granny offers Loonette advice or lessons, often with the help of Major Bedhead, who delivers gifts and messages from Auntie Macassar or Uncle Chester. Towards the end of each show, Loonette finds her belongings cluttered on the floor and says, "Who made this big mess?", the camera would then zoom in on either Loonette or Molly in which she asks it was either her or Molly then the camera would quickly pan up and down as a way of saying yes, then Loonette explains it's only fair for them to clean it up, and she performs a fastest clean-up routine called the Ten Second Tidy. All episodes end with Loonette and Molly having a nap and sometimes reminding the viewers to remember the moral of today's episode. After Loonette and Molly go to sleep, a large crescent moon with a clown nose rises above the starry background behind the couch and the credits then roll over a lullaby version of the theme song, ending with Loonette doing a short role-play of "Hey Diddle Diddle" by saying "And the clown jumped over the moon!" In one episode, Loonette says, "Ah, ah, AH-CHOO!" And in another episode, Loonette says, "And the clown—hiccup!—over the moon!"

In seasons 1–5, there is the Alphabet Game segment, where a certain letter is shown on a giant alphabet block and Loonette uses certain words beginning with that letter and also makes the letter's shape with her body to get the viewers to guess the letter. In season 7, Loonette and Molly play the Dream Game and Molly gives out the letter that the dream starts with and provide what they will be dreaming about. In season 6, Loonette and Molly go to Doll School where Molly learns the alphabet, numbers or both.

Along with the lessons and problem solving sequences, the show also emphasized imaginative play. Episodes often take place in the context of a visit to Clowntown, such as Granny Garbanzo's Cabbage Club Cooking School and Major Bedhead's Clown Chi Dojo and Dancing School. Additionally, Loonette is gifted in the art of classical dance and runs Miss Loonette's Dance Academy. Starting in Season 7, Loonette makes more frequent trips to Clowntown, and she volunteers at the Clowndergarten, where she teaches young clowns games, songs and stories. This imaginative play was also demonstrated through dress-up games and through Loonette's dollhouse, in which she imagined the adventures of The Foley Family. Shown first as a doll-sized family, in Loonette's imagination they would become a family of regular-sized clowns, whose nonverbal but high-energy activities were shown in high speed and with a musical background in the style of old silent movies.

Two Dust Bunny characters, small, puppeteered dust creatures that lived underneath Loonette's couch, also appeared in many episodes of the show. Although Molly discovered the Dust Bunnies early in the first season, for most of the show's run Loonette didn't believe that there were dust bunnies under the couch.

Characters

Main
Loonette (portrayed by Alyson Court from 1992 to 2002 and Ramona Gilmour-Darling in 2006) is the freckled-faced female lead of the series.  She is a young clown living with her doll, Molly, in their house, on the eponymous Big Comfy Couch, an oversized green floral couch. She wears a pink jumper and a white shirt with suns and moons with purple sleeves. She also wears a purple hat on her head with her pigtails coming out and wears black and white striped tights with black shoes adorned with suns on each side. She frequently reads stories to Molly, always performs a Clock Rug Stretch, and likes to visit Granny Garbanzo. Auntie Macassar (in seasons 1–5) or Uncle Chester (in seasons 6-7) frequently send Loonette postcards and gifts by mail, which Major Bedhead delivers on his unicycle. Loonette is gifted in the art of classical dance and runs Miss Loonette's Dance Academy. Another gift she possesses is the unusual skill to clean just about any mess up in ten seconds, which she calls the Ten Second Tidy.Initially, Loonette was too young to visit Clowntown, but starting from 2006, Loonette makes frequent trips to Clowntown to visit Granny's Cabbage Club Cooking School and Major Bedhead's Clown Chi Dojo and Dancing School. The trips to the first location help teach Loonette how to cook. The trips to this second location indicate that she practices martial arts. Loonette also takes Molly to Clowndergarten and helps out with the other young clowns.
Molly (the sidekick of the series) (puppeteered by Bob Stutt) is Loonette's living doll. Loonette found her in a barrel with a sign marked "Free to a good home", and adopted her. Molly wears a blue (occasionally yellow) dress. She believes that dust bunnies really exist, despite Loonette's disbelief. Her favourite food is donuts. Her hobbies include playing her fiddle and going fishing. She only speaks by cartoon bubbles, and usually answers Loonette's yes or no questions by either nodding or shaking her head.

Additional
Fuzzy and Wuzzy (Dust Bunnies) (puppeteered and voiced by Bob Stutt and Robert Mills) are twin dust bunnies who live under the Big Comfy Couch. Only Molly is aware of their existence, and she always does her best to protect them so she can play with them. The two dust bunnies sometimes find things that get under the couch and when they do, they play with those objects and after a while, they throw it or push it back out from under the couch. Fuzzy has gray bunny ears, and Wuzzy has red bunny ears. Both of them speak gibberish, but sometimes also speak human words. 
The Foley Family, Andy (portrayed by Fred Stinson), Jim (portrayed by Jani Lauzon), and Eileen (portrayed by Jackie Harris in Seasons 1–2) and Suzanne Merriam in Seasons 3–5)) are a very silly family who live inside of Loonette's dollhouse. They appeared from Seasons 1–5.
Granny Garbanzo (portrayed by Grindl Kuchirka) is Loonette's grandmother and next-door neighbor who loves her and Molly dearly. She comes from the "old country" and has a foreign Russian accent. Granny also likes growing in her garden and she lives inside a wagon with Snicklefritz, her cat. Her name is derived from the garbanzo bean.
Snicklefritz (puppeteered and voiced by Bob Stutt) is Granny's mischievous cat, who was introduced in Season 2. He likes to play pranks on the others and sometimes tries to get out of getting flea-baths. The name Snicklefritz comes from slang in German culture.
Major Bedhead (portrayed by Fred Stinson) is the local clown courier who makes deliveries to Loonette from Auntie Macassar or Uncle Chester. He can be quite goofy at times and a bit clumsy. He also dislikes lying and being dishonest. Despite popular belief, his real occupation is not a mail courier, however an Army Major. Major is his rank with “Bedhead” being his Sir name.
Auntie Macassar (portrayed by Taborah Johnson) is Loonette's travelling aunt who likes to make an entrance whenever she visits. She appears in Seasons 1–5. Her name is a pun on antimacassar.
Wobbly (portrayed by Gary Farmer) is a close friend who lives in Clowntown. Appears in two episodes in Season 2.
Uncle Chester (portrayed by Edward Knuckles) is Loonette's travelling uncle who appears in the show's last two seasons.

Production
The show was originally produced by Radical Sheep Productions with what would later be known as Owl Communications (the publishers of Owl Magazine), then Canadian children's television network YTV and WITF-TV Harrisburg, with a run of 65 episodes. In 2000, the previous episodes were produced with Benny Smart, a US children's television production company, Tadpole Kids and Treehouse TV, a sister channel of YTV, and Nashville Public Television. At the end of this show (previously produced with Benny Smart), a companion guide appears for the viewers to learn about it.

From 1992 to 2002, the show was filmed at Wallace Avenue Studios in Toronto, and in 2006, it was filmed at Toronto's Studio City.

Radical Sheep Productions and Amity Entertainment, in association with Treehouse TV and Nashville Public Television, produced 22 additional episodes, which debuted on American Public Television in 2006.

Episodes

Season 1 (1992)

Season 2 (1993)
A large painting of someone is now hanging on Loonette's wall to the upper right next to the couch and a fence and garden wall to Granny's garden is added. All Dance Academy shows are announced by Fred Stinson. Snicklefritz also debuts in this season.

Season 3 (1994)
The intro changes starting this season, and now features Snicklefritz and Auntie Macassar. Auntie Macassar now speaks in the postcards sent to Loonette. The Clock Rug gets a new redesign with darker colors, a new font for the numbers. The cuckoo theme for the Clock Rug is no longer used. Instead of this, a new clock rug stretch theme is added. Also, Granny's garden is redesigned with brighter green grass.

Season 4 (1995)

Season 5 (1996)
This was the final season of The Foley Family Gags,  Miss Loonette's Dance Academy, The Alphabet Game, Auntie Macassar, and the original lullaby ending music theme. This was also the final season that the stories Loonette read were illustrated. The 3rd Clock Rug theme is no longer used.

Season 6 (2002)
The intro changes again with children's vocals re-recorded. This was the final season where Alyson Court plays the role of Loonette. The couch is redesigned and Auntie Macassar will no longer return, she's replaced by Uncle Chester that now sends the postcards to Loonette. The dustbunny music and the ending music have been changed in this season as well. Each episode features Molly attending Doll School with Loonette accompanying her (rotating between The Alphabet Song, counting to 10 or both). The stories that Loonette reads are now in live action which introduces a city for clowns called Clowntown. Even though the Foley Family segments were discontinued in this season, the dollhouse was still seen on the set next to the couch. Miss Loonette's Dance Academy has also been discontinued for the rest of the series along with the Alphabet Game.

Season 7 (2006)
Ramona Gilmour-Darling replaces Alyson Court in the role of Loonette. The Clock Rug is now smaller with darker colours. Also in this season, Loonette and Molly visit places in Clowntown. Additionally, while Molly and Loonette are sleeping at the end of each episode prior to the credits, they play the dream game, dreaming about letters of the alphabet and what starts with that letter. Also the moon that rises up in the show’s ending credits is larger and changed to yellow.  The dollhouse was removed. In addition, this season featured the fewest episodes with Loonette reading Molly a story.

Broadcast and syndication
In the U.S., the series was syndicated by American Public Television to public television stations in that country, most of which were affiliated with PBS, starting on January 9, 1995 and ending in February 2007, with reruns airing as late as May 2009 on some stations. In Canada, the series was shown on YTV from 1992 to 1997 and on Treehouse TV from 1997 until it ceased broadcasting on February 27, 2011. As of 2023, all episodes can be viewed on Amazon Prime, Vudu, Tubi, the FilmRise app, and YouTube. From September 1, 1997 to 2001, the French-language dub was aired on Canal Famille in Quebec and on TF1 in France.

Home media
Time-Life Video was the main home media distributor for the Big Comfy Couch, releasing the series under Time-Life Video's children's label, Time-Life Kids. VHS releases were also released on May 10, 2000 by Goldhil Video.

The Big Comfy Couch has five DVDs featuring Ramona Gilmour-Darling. The DVDs and VHS tapes that feature Alyson Court are now out of print, but can be found on certain websites such as Amazon.com.

On July 30, 2013, TGG Direct released the first two seasons on DVD in Region 1 for the very first time. Seasons 3-7 were released on August 6, 2013.

Merchandise and other media
Throughout the years, several merchandise has been sold under the show's banner such as videotapes, DVDs, books, dolls, toys and puzzles.

Album releases
Several albums of the original songs written by JP Houston and performed by the cast were released on August 9, 2005 by Time-Life, as well as Naxos Music.

App releases
In 2015 and 2016, Radical Sheep, in association with Sticky Brain Studios, released some apps based on the series.

 Just Ask Molly - Released April 1, 2015, this app allows the player to ask Molly any question, and she can communicate to the player via her thought bubbles.
 Fuzzy Wuzzy Fun - Released April 1, 2015, this app features the dust bunnies Fuzzy and Wuzzy playing hide and seek. The objective for the player is to help them find each other by navigating through paths.
 Clock Rug Time - Released May 18, 2015, this app features Loonette and her clock rug stretch routine. Loonette can set the time for the player in both analog and digital. This app can also be used as an alarm clock. The app can also display the weather and temperature based on location.
 Molly's Big Day - Released May 17, 2016, this app focuses on Molly and her big first day in Clowndergarten with the use of activities for the player.

This Hour Has 22 Minutes
On the October 18, 2016 episode of This Hour Has 22 Minutes, in a segment discussing the 2016 clown sightings, Loonette made an appearance as the show's "clown correspondent." This marked the character's first television appearance in a decade since the show's finale in 2006 and the first time Alyson Court had portrayed Loonette on TV since her departure in 2002.

Tours
The Big Comfy Couch has had a few live shows at Londonderry Mall in Edmonton, Alberta and sometimes in Calgary and rarely in Regina, Saskatchewan.

Loonette and Molly Live Theatrical Tour
In 2007, a live theatrical production entitled Molly's Fool Moon Festival toured in Canada. The show included Loonette, Molly, Granny Garbanzo, Major Bedhead and others. The show was produced by Koba Entertainment and presented by Paquin Entertainment Group.

References

External links

Big Comfy Couch Episode Guide
Big Comfy Couch Full Episodes: Iowa Public Television
Big Comfy Couch Episode Guide: TV.com
Big Comfy Couch: MSN TV
Big Comfy Couch: AOL Television

1990s Canadian children's television series
1990s Canadian comedy television series
2000s Canadian children's television series
2000s Canadian comedy television series
1993 Canadian television series debuts
2006 Canadian television series endings
Canadian children's comedy television series
PBS original programming
PBS Kids shows
Treehouse TV original programming
YTV (Canadian TV channel) original programming
Television shows filmed in Toronto
Canadian television shows featuring puppetry
English-language television shows
Television series by Corus Entertainment
Fictional clowns
Television shows about clowns
Canadian preschool education television series
1990s preschool education television series
2000s preschool education television series
Television series by Radical Sheep Productions